Ippesheim is a municipality in the district of Neustadt (Aisch)-Bad Windsheim in Bavaria in Germany.

Personalities 

 Vitus Müller (1561-1626), Protestant theologian and philologist, professor at the University of Tübingen

References

Neustadt (Aisch)-Bad Windsheim